Ustaritz Aldekoaotalora Astarloa (born 16 February 1983), known simply as Ustaritz, is a Spanish former professional footballer who played as a central defender.

Most of his professional career was spent with Athletic Bilbao, for which he appeared in 103 official matches during seven years. In 2013, he won the double with Dinamo Tbilisi in Georgia.

Club career

Athletic Bilbao
Born in Abadiño, Biscay, Lezama graduate Ustaritz made his debut with Athletic Bilbao's first team during the 2005–06 season, taking part in 17 La Liga matches that year. However, he found starting chances in La Liga hard to come in the subsequent years, being mainly restricted to appearances in the Copa del Rey and the UEFA Cup – in 2007–08 he played a career-best 20 games, but the Basques could only rank in 11th place.

From 2008 to 2011, Ustaritz made a combined 36 league appearances, scoring his first competitive goal for the club on 29 November 2009 in a 4–1 away win against UD Almería. In mid-August 2011, he was loaned to fellow league team Real Betis in a season-long move.

Ustaritz's contract with Athletic was terminated by mutual consent on 31 August 2012.

Later years
In February 2013, the 30-year-old Ustaritz moved abroad for the first time, signing with FC Dinamo Tbilisi in Georgia and sharing teams with several compatriots. He played six games over the remainder of the season as his team won the Premier League, scoring in a 6–1 victory over FC Zestafoni in the last fixture on 18 May. Four days later, a double was secured with a 3–1 defeat of FC Chikhura Sachkhere in the Georgian Cup final, with the player being dismissed late on.

Ustaritz recorded two goals in four games in Dinamo's unsuccessful qualification campaign for the UEFA Champions League in the summer. On 30 January 2014, he returned to the Iberian Peninsula, signing an eighteen-month deal at Primeira Liga club F.C. Arouca. Roughly one year later, after only two appearances – totalling less than five minutes playing time – he switched to another side in the same division, F.C. Penafiel.

Honours
Dinamo Tbilisi
Georgian Premier League: 2012–13
Georgian Cup: 2012–13

References

External links

1983 births
Living people
People from Abadiño
Spanish footballers
Footballers from the Basque Country (autonomous community)
Association football defenders
La Liga players
Segunda División B players
Tercera División players
CD Basconia footballers
Bilbao Athletic footballers
Athletic Bilbao footballers
Real Betis players
Erovnuli Liga players
FC Dinamo Tbilisi players
Primeira Liga players
F.C. Arouca players
F.C. Penafiel players
Spanish expatriate footballers
Expatriate footballers in Georgia (country)
Expatriate footballers in Portugal
Spanish expatriate sportspeople in Georgia (country)
Spanish expatriate sportspeople in Portugal